Hendrix v Raad van Bestuur van het Uitvoeringsinstituut Werknemersverzekeringen (2007) C-287/05 is an EU law case, concerning the free movement of workers in the European Union.

Facts
Mr Hendrix claimed he should still receive incapacity benefit after he moved from Netherlands to Belgium from the Dutch Board of Directors of the Employee Insurance Institute. He continued to work in the Netherlands. Young people in the Netherlands could get incapacity benefit. This was a non-contributory benefit, reserved for people residing in the Netherlands.

Judgment
The Court of Justice, Grand Chamber, held that the incapacity benefit was a social advantage under Regulation 492/11. This was a rule specifically expressing the principle in TFEU article 45(2). This meant a residency requirement could be reviewed. In this case it was indirect discrimination, unless it could be justified. It could be justified on the facts.

See also

European Union law

Notes

References
M Dougan, ‘Legal Developments’ (2008) 46 JCMS 127, 137, the CJEU is ‘taking away from the political institutions an appreciable part of their power to decide on important questions of public expenditure and social solidarity.’

Court of Justice of the European Union case law